Americas Paralympic Committee (acronym: APC;  ;  ;  ;) is an international IPC regional committee which represents the current 33 National Paralympic Committees of the North American and South American continents. It is affiliated to/with the International Paralympic Committee and its affiliated bodies.

APC is the body that organizes and oversees the Parapan American Games held every four years in the year before the Summer Paralympics.

Member countries 
In the following table, the year in which the NPC was recognized by the International Paralympic Committee (IPC) is also given if it is different from the year in which the NPC was created.

See also
 Pan American Sports Organization
 Parapan American Games
 Pan American Games

References

External links 
 Americas Paralympic Committee Official Website

Pan-American sports governing bodies
Americas Paralympic Committee